Tanaecia julii, the common earl, is a species of nymphalid butterfly found in South and South-East Asia.

Gallery

See also
List of butterflies of India (Nymphalidae)

References

Tanaecia
Butterflies of Asia